The Boulevard du Crime was the nickname given in the 19th century to the Boulevard du Temple in Paris because of the many crime melodramas that were shown every night in its many theaters.  It is notorious in French history for having lost so many theatres during the rebuilding of Paris by Baron Haussmann in 1862. Of the theatres on the boulevard, only the Folies-Mayer escaped demolition during the construction of Place de la République—solely because it was on the opposite side of the street.

In spite of the name, the "Boulevard of Crime" was not dangerous or unpleasant.  In fact, it was one of the most popular places in Paris.  Every night more than 20,000 people came to walk, sing, laugh and have fun.

The "Boulevard du Crime" is featured in the 1945 film Children of Paradise directed by Marcel Carné and gives its name to the first of two sections of the film.

Theaters on Boulevard du Crime demolished in the great reorganization of 1862

 the Théâtre Lyrique
 the Cirque Olympique
 the Théâtre des Folies-Dramatiques
 the Théâtre des Funambules
 the Théâtre de la Gaîté
 the Théâtre des Délassements-Comiques
 the Théâtre des Associés (renamed Theatre Patriotic under the Revolution, and Théâtre de Mme Saqui)
 the Théâtre des Pygmées
 the Petit-Lazare
 many other cabarets and cafés

References

External links
 Le Boulevard du crime by Mario Proth, Balitout-Questroy and Co., Paris, 1872

11th arrondissement of Paris
Crime
Former theatres in Paris